Succineoidea is a taxonomic superfamily of air-breathing land snails, terrestrial pulmonate gastropod mollusks in the suborder Helicina.

Families
 Succineidae Beck, 1837

References

 Bouchet P., Rocroi J.P., Hausdorf B., Kaim A., Kano Y., Nützel A., Parkhaev P., Schrödl M. & Strong E.E. (2017). Revised classification, nomenclator and typification of gastropod and monoplacophoran families. Malacologia. 61(1-2): 1-526.

Monotypic protostome taxa
Gastropod superfamilies